Chozick is a surname. Notable people with the surname include:

Amy Chozick, American political reporter
Matthew Chozick (born 1980), American actor, writer, and television personality